Reppert-Gabler House, also known as Building 314A, is a historic home located at Monongahela Township in Greene County, Pennsylvania. The original section was built about 1810, and is a -story, four bay, brick dwelling in a vernacular Federal-style.  An addition was built about 1880, and has Italianate-style details. The house is associated with the New Geneva Glassworks.

It was listed on the National Register of Historic Places in 1995.

References 

Houses on the National Register of Historic Places in Pennsylvania
Federal architecture in Pennsylvania
Italianate architecture in Pennsylvania
Houses completed in 1880
Houses in Greene County, Pennsylvania
National Register of Historic Places in Greene County, Pennsylvania